Plasmus is a fictional character appearing in American comic books published by DC Comics. He is depicted as an enemy of the Teen Titans.

Publication history
Plasmus first appeared in The New Teen Titans #14 and was created by Marv Wolfman and George Pérez.

Fictional character biography
Otto Von Furth was a mine worker in East Berlin, Germany until an unexpected cave-in trapped him and four fellow miners for seven days. During those days, Otto's co-workers died, leaving him as the only survivor. He and his fellow miners had been mining for radioactive radium and ended up exposed to it and when rescued, he was rushed to the hospital. Otto is later kidnapped by ex-Nazi General Zahl, who mutated him into a blob-like state. His body changed into an unstable protoplasm. He is brought into the Brotherhood of Evil where he took the name Plasmus. He and the Brotherhood of Evil fight the Teen Titans on different occasions. He enjoys these fights, but regrets not being the one to finally kill General Zahl. Later, Plasmus ends up as one of the many metabeings corrupted and brainwashed by a cult-leader. The rest of the Brotherhood of Evil reform into the Society of Sin. He is later recruited into Lex Luthor's Suicide Squad where he apparently dies fighting Imperiex.

Plasmus accepts an invitation to join the Secret Society of Super Villains in the Countdown to Infinite Crisis series Villains United.

Plasmus is featured in Infinite Crisis as part of a small group of villains that bombs the city of Blüdhaven. The creature known as Chemo is dropped from an aircraft and detonates, resulting in the deaths of hundreds of thousands of innocent people.

During the One Year Later crossover, Plasmus rejoins the Brotherhood of Evil. He is also seen in Salvation Run. He is used by Lex Luthor as a power source for a teleportation device, and is killed when it self-destructs.

Plasmus appears in Blue Beetle #1 from The New 52 (a 2011 reboot of the DC Comics universe). He is one of the villains looking for the scarab with Phobia and Warp for the Brotherhood of Evil.

Powers and abilities
With his chemically-converted body, Plasmus' burning touch can bring a fiery death onto whomever he makes physical contact with, thus reducing them to a protoplasmic state. His touch is incurable and no normal human has withstood it. Plasmus possesses immense strength, stamina, and durability, as well as self-healing capabilities.

In other media

Television
 Plasmus appears in Teen Titans, vocal effects provided by Dee Bradley Baker. This version's alter ego uncontrollably transform into a large, magenta sludge monster when he is awake, only reverting to human form when he is asleep or unconscious. Additionally, in his monstrous form, Plasmus can detach varying quantities of himself, which can act independently and often take on crab-like forms. Introduced in the pilot episode "Divide and Conquer", Plasmus is imprisoned and kept within a stasis chamber until Cinderblock breaks him out to fight the Teen Titans on Slade's behalf. In the episode "Transformation", the Titans inadvertently mix Plasmus with raw sewage, mutating him into a multi-eyed form with the ability to spit acid. In "Aftershock (Part 2)", Plasmus is temporarily fused with Cinderblock and Overload into "Ternion", but they are ultimately separated from each other. Following Slade's death, Plasmus joins the Brotherhood of Evil in season five, only to be flash-frozen alongside them by the Titans.
 Plasmus appears in the Teen Titans Go! episode "You're Fired!" This version resembles the Teen Titans animated series' incarnation post-mutation.
 Plasmus appears in Young Justice: Outsiders, voiced by Yuri Lowenthal. This version is a child who was mutated by Dr. Simon Ecks and fell under Count Vertigo's control. Additionally, Otto has a sister named Ana (voiced by Grey Griffin), who was similarly mutated into a lava-like monster called "Plasma" and fell under the Light's control. After Ana's heart gives out while being forced to fight the Justice League, Otto is forced to fight the Outsiders. While Black Lightning frees Plasmus from Vertigo's control, a concerned civilian kills the latter, believing he was a monster.

Miscellaneous
Plasmus appears in the Justice League Unlimited tie-in comic book.

References

Fictional German people
DC Comics characters with accelerated healing
DC Comics characters with superhuman strength
DC Comics supervillains
DC Comics metahumans
DC Comics titles
Comics characters introduced in 1981
Characters created by George Pérez
Characters created by Marv Wolfman
Fictional amorphous creatures
Fictional characters who can duplicate themselves
Fictional characters who can stretch themselves
Fictional characters with superhuman durability or invulnerability
Fictional miners